Mont Thabor is a mountain of Savoie and Hautes-Alpes, France. It lies in the Massif des Cerces range. It has an elevation of 3,178 metres above sea level, it stands close to another summit, the Pic du Thabor, culminating at 3,207 metres above sea level.

Mountains of the Alps
Alpine three-thousanders
Mountains of Savoie
Mountains of Hautes-Alpes